Earl Scott may refer to:
 Earl Scott (coach)
 Earl Scott (singer)